Association Sportive des Douanes, commonly known as AS Douanes, is a Senegalese basketball club from Dakar. Part of the Senegalese customs organisation, the team plays in the national top division Nationale 1 and is among the country's most decorated teams, having won 10 national titles. AS Douanes played and will play in the Basketball Africa League (BAL) in the 2021 and 2023 seasons.

History
AS Douanes was established in 1980, as the basketball section of the Senegalese customs organisation. In 1998, the team won its first national championship.

In October 2019, Douane won the Senegalese championship after defeating DUC in the final. By winning, Douanes qualified directly for the inaugural season of the Basketball Africa League (BAL) as an automatic spot was granted to the Senegalese champions.

After losing the 2021 title to DUC, Douanes won their 10th national title on 16 October 2022, after beating their arch-rivals 2–0 in the finals series.

Players

Current roster
As of 7 February 2023.

Head coach: Pabi Gueye

Individual awards 
Nationale 1 King of the Season

 Ibrahima Mbengue – 2011
 Birahim Gaye – 2014
 Louis Adams – 2017
 Pape Moustapha Diop – 2018, 2019

Nationale 1 Finals MVP

 Samba Dali Fall – 2022

Nationale 1 Coach of the Year

 Pabi Gueye – 2016, 2019

Honours
Nationale 1
Champions (10): 1998,  2007,  2008,  2011,  2014,  2016,  2017,  2018,  2019, 2022
Senegalese Cup
Winners (7): 2000,  2004,  2006,  2011,  2012,  2017,  2019
Mayor's Cup
Winners (13): 1988,  1995,  1996,  1997,  1998,  2006,  2007,  2009,  2011,  2012,  2014,  2017,  2018
Saint-Michel Cup
Winners (4): 1993,  2005,  2007,  2018

In FIBA and BAL competitions
AS Douanes has played seven games at the main stages of African basketball tournaments, winning 1 out of 7 games.

References

External links
AS Douane Dakar at Afrobasket.com

Basketball teams in Senegal
Basketball teams established in 1980
Sport in Dakar
Basketball Africa League teams